Biedrzychów may refer to the following places in Poland:
Biedrzychów, Lower Silesian Voivodeship (south-west Poland)
Biedrzychów, Świętokrzyskie Voivodeship (south-central Poland)